An S and S Coupling also known as a Bicycle Torque Coupling or BTC is a coupling which enables bicycle frames to be separated into smaller pieces, usually to facilitate packing and transporting. Couplings can be built into the frame by the frame manufacturer when the frame is made or can be added to a frame after it is finished. A special spanner is available for tightening and loosening the couplings.

Applications
The couplings are usually installed in the top tube and down tube of a single-rider diamond frame. This enables the bicycle to be boxed small enough to avoid the extra fee most airlines charge to check a bicycle as luggage. They can also be installed in tandem and recumbent frames. Santana manufactures a "triplet (or quad) that can be transformed into a tandem by simply removing the center section of the frame."

Characteristics
They use a Hirth joint to resist torsion.

It takes a few minutes to separate the couplings.

Alternatives
In order to support the ovalized tube Santana Cycles uses between the bottom bracket shells of their tandems, they have developed their own oval couplers.

See also 
Folding bicycle
Recumbent bicycle
Tandem bicycle
Touring bicycle

References

External links
 http://www.sandsmachine.com/ S and S Machine Bicycle Torque Couplings (BTCs)
 http://www.bikecad.ca/boxes Determining the placement of couplings in BikeCAD

Coupler